is the chairman and chief executive officer (CEO) of The Oriental Land Company, and the representative director, chairman and CEO of the Tokyo Disney Resort in Japan.

Early life

In 1958, Kagami graduated from Keio University in Tokyo, Japan, with a bachelor's degree

Career

In 2009, Kagami was named chairman and CEO of The Oriental Land Company Ltd., and chairman of Milial Resort Hotels Co Ltd.

References 

1936 births
Japanese chief executives
Businesspeople from Tokyo
Living people
Keio University alumni